"Kids Again" is a 2014 song by British recording artist Example. It was released as the second single from his fifth studio album, Live Life Living, on 16 March 2014 in the United Kingdom by Epic Records. The song is written and produced by Example, Alf Bamford, and Fraser T Smith.

Background and release
The EP will feature remixes from MOTi, Zed Bias, Dimension and Critikal as well as an extended mix. On 20 January the Zed Bias, MOTi and Critikal remixes were uploaded to Example's YouTube channel.

Critical reception
Lewis Corner of Digital Spy gave the song a mixed-to-positive review stating:
"While our idea of reclaiming our youth involves Sabrina The Teenage Witch marathons, Example is feeling rather more adventurous. "We'll see wherever we wanna see/ Run away from home, they'll never reach us," he declares, leading his missus on an adrenaline-fuelled jaunt across the globe, soundtracked by his trademark mix of stomping club beats and Ibiza-ready synths. Yes, Example is re-treading previous territory with his brand of lad EDM, but it's hard not to be charmed by his new perkier outlook on life."

Music video
Example uploaded the music video to his VEVO channel on 12 February. Example filmed the music video on location in Miami at the beginning of February with several of his fans raving to the music. The video was directed by Jon Jon Augustavo. It has since gathered over 2,800,000 views. On 3 March, the video for the MOTi remix was uploaded to Example's VEVO Channel. The video for the MOTi remix has gathered over 220,000 views.

Track listing

Chart performance

Release history

Personnel
 Elliot Gleave - vocals, composition, production
 Fraser T Smith - production
 Alfie "Critikal" Bamford - co-production

References 

2014 singles
2014 songs
Example (musician) songs
Sony Music singles
Eurodance songs
Songs written by Fraser T. Smith
Song recordings produced by Fraser T. Smith
Songs written by Example (musician)
Epic Records singles
Songs written by Technikal